Harutaeographa monimalis is a moth of the family Noctuidae. It is found in China (Yunnan).

References

Moths described in 1950
Orthosiini